George Helgesen Fitch (June 5, 1877 – August 9, 1915) was an American author, humorist, and journalist perhaps best known for his stories about fictional Siwash College.

Biography
Fitch was born in Galva, Illinois.  He was the eldest son of Elmer Eli Fitch, editor and publisher of the Galva News, and Rachel Helgesen, daughter of Thomas and Anna (Holverson) Helgesen. His grandfather, Thomas Helgesen, was a native of Norway who had immigrated to America in 1848.

Fitch graduated from Knox College in 1897.  He worked as a reporter for a number of midwest newspapers including the Council Bluffs, Iowa Daily Nonpareil and the Peoria, Illinois Herald-Transcript. Eventually he became frequently published in national magazines, breaking in with his popular "Megaphone" series satirizing urban America.  He also penned a syndicated column called "Vest Pocket Essays". By 1910, Fitch not only was a respected writer and editor, he became a nationally syndicated columnist for George Matthew Adams' news service. He was elected as a Progressive Party candidate to the Illinois House of Representatives in 1912.

Knox, his alma mater, was the basis of a series of popular stories set at "Good Old Siwash College".  First appearing in the Saturday Evening Post in 1908, they focused on characters including football player Ole Skjarson and Petey Simmons, a coach who paid his "amateur" athletes as well as the fraternity Eta Bita Pie. The Siwash stories were the basis for the movie Those Were the Days! (1940) starring William Holden as Simmons, which was filmed on location at and around Knox College.

Fitch died of a ruptured appendix while visiting his sister Louise in California at the age of 38.

Quotes
Fitch gave an early form of the adage "Journalism is the first rough draft of history": 
A reporter is a young man who blocks out the first draft of history each day on a rheumatic typewriter.
See Wikiquote article for details.

Selected works
At Good Old Siwash (1910)
Homeburg Memories (1915)
Vest Pocket Essays (1916)

References

Other sources
Past and Present of Fayette County Iowa  (B.F. Bowen & Co. Indianapolis. 1910)
 Fitch, Roscoe Conkling History of the Fitch Family 1400–1930 (1930)
George Fitch (The Literary Encyclopedia. July 17, 2001)

External links

 
 

1877 births
1915 deaths
People from Galva, Illinois
American people of Norwegian descent
Illinois Progressives (1912)
Knox College (Illinois) alumni
Members of the Illinois House of Representatives
American humorists
American male writers
Writers from Illinois
Deaths from appendicitis
19th-century American politicians